Thornton and Allerton is a ward in the metropolitan borough of the City of Bradford, West Yorkshire, England.  It contains 135 listed buildings that are recorded in the National Heritage List for England.  Of these, two are listed at Grade I, the highest of the three grades, six are at Grade II*, the middle grade, and the others are at Grade II, the lowest grade.  The ward contains the villages of Thornton and Allerton, the hamlet of Egypt, and the surrounding countryside.  Most of the listed buildings are houses, cottages and associated structures, farmhouses and farm buildings.  The other listed buildings include churches, a chapel, the ruins of another chapel, public houses, textile mill buildings, a railway viaduct, and two war memorials.


Key

Buildings

References

Citations

Sources

 

Lists of listed buildings in West Yorkshire